Stephanie Brind, (born 8 June 1977 in Bexleyheath, Kent) is a professional squash player who represented England. She is a right-handed squash player and her former coach is Paul Carter. She reached a career-high world ranking of World No. 4 in November 2001.

Brind attended Bexley Grammar School from 1988 to 1995.

Her greatest achievement was being part of the England team that won the 2000 Women's World Team Squash Championships held in Sheffield.

See also
 Official Women's Squash World Ranking

References

External links 

English female squash players
Living people
1977 births
People from Bexleyheath
People from Greenhithe